The Golden Age is the debut studio album from French singer-songwriter and director Woodkid. It was released on 18 March 2013 through independent label, Green United Music. Lemoine released the official album cover through a video he created himself on 14 December 2012 and released the album's corresponding track listing one week later on 21 December 2012 on his official Facebook page.

During an interview with NBHAP, Lemoine indicated that The Golden Age was inspired by his childhood, which he considered his "Golden Age".

Singles
Three songs appearing in the album have been released as singles:
 "Iron" – Released on 28 March 2011
 "Run Boy Run" – Released on 21 May 2012
 "I Love You" – Released in February 2013 to coincide with official release of the album

"Run Boy Run" was used in several O2 adverts (those voiced by Sean Bean).

The music video for Woodkid track "Run Boy Run" was nominated for Best Short Form Music Video at the 2013 Grammy Awards. It was directed by Yoann Lemoine (Woodkid) himself.

Reception

Critical response 

On Metacritic, the album has a score of 66 out of 100, based on 9 reviews.

Logan Smithson of PopMatters states "There can be no doubt against the fact that The Golden Age feels powerful.  Whether it’s more of a thoughtless Michael Bay thriller or a deep adventure with the intricacies of Christopher Nolan, there are definitely explosions galore and production values that will keep you on the edge of your seat. There aren’t many albums that sound like Woodkid’s The Golden Age. If you’re in the mood for something bold, with loud production and poetic lyrics,  The Golden Age might be worth hearing. It just might not be an experience that sticks with you in the long run."

Heather Phares of AllMusic said that while "it's beyond cliche to call sweeping, orchestral music "filmic," but in the case of music video director Yoann Lemoine's debut album as Woodkid, The Golden Age, the term fits." He also stated that "Lemoine's music is more in line with Antony & the Johnsons -- lavish, often torchy songs that pair dramatic backdrops with his charmingly imperfect vocals", and, despite the fact that it is an "at times exhausting album, The Golden Age shows Lemoine is skilled at making music as well as music videos."

Track listing

Charts

Weekly charts

Year-end charts

Certifications

References

Woodkid albums
2013 debut albums
European Border Breakers Award-winning albums